Naeem Rahim (born January 1, 1976) is an American nephrologist and founder of Idaho based JRM foundation For humanity & Co-founder of Idaho Kidney Institute. He was one of the First Idahoans to receive the Ellis Island Medals of Honor in the last 25 years.

Early life and education 
Naeem Rahim a Pakistani American was born in Peshawar, Pakistan as his father Mohammad Rahim was an Army officer and mother was a nurse in the Army. He went to Habib public school Karachi for matriculation and went to Aga Khan medical college for medicine graduated in 1998. He is fluent in English, Urdu and Punjabi.

Career

Medical practice 
Naeem & his brother Fahim Rahim trained from New York Medical College in internal medicine and later nephrology.
They chose to move to a small town in Idaho to provide better health care to the much needed rural America.
Naeem Rahim and Fahim Rahim both received Ellis Island Medals of Honor in 2010 and subsequently multiple congressional records in recognition of their services to the state of Idaho.
Naeem was one of the first Idahoans to receive the Ellis Island Medals of Honor. They decided to honor the people of Idaho and started JRM foundation For humanity. Fahim Rahim & Naeem also started Idaho hometown heroes Medal which identifies and celebrates individuals who serve their communities in Idaho. Naeem was showcased as success stories of Pakistanis on a TV show called Reema Ka Amreeka hosted by famous Pakistani actress Reema Khan.

Institutional positions

Affiliate faculty at Idaho State University, responsible for Nephrology curriculum for Physicians Assistant school, Nursing school. Involved in clinical lectures.
 Founder and co-owner of Idaho Kidney Institute, Idaho. One of the largest provider for patients with kidney disease in South Eastern Idaho.
Founder and managing partner Nephro Consultants, health care consulting firm for medical practices and start-ups.
Founder and Chairman Board of Directors for JRM Foundation for Humanity, a non-profit organization looking to raise funds for charities of choice.
Co-founder and Managing partner at 3 i Sessions, a startup advisory firm.
Founding member and chairman for Idaho's Hometown Hero Medal.
Member of Board of Directors, Brighter Tomorrow's, a child advocacy center.
Radio talk show host for KISU/NPR "House Call", a weekly radio show.
Medical Advisor of Consultant Medical Group, a panel of medical experts who perform objective review & analysis of cases arising from personal injury litigation.
Director, Home program for Idaho Kidney center, Pocatello.
Director, Home program for Idaho Kidney center, Idaho Falls.
Physician partner of Liberty Dialysis, the third largest dialysis provider in USA.
Former Vice President of the Committee of Interns and Residents, largest union of in training physicians in USA.
Former president for South East Idaho Medical Association.

Awards
Recipient of US Senate Congressional Record in 2007 from Senator Mike Crapo.
Recipient of Ellis Island Medals of Honor, in 2011.
Recipient of Congressional Record by US House of Representatives in July, 2011 (Hon. Dan Burton of Indiana, Co-chair Congressional Pakistan Caucus)
Recipient of Congressional Record by US House 112th Congress Sept. 2011

References 

1976 births
American medical journalists
American radio journalists
Living people
People from Pocatello, Idaho
New York Medical College alumni
American nephrologists
Pakistani emigrants to the United States
Aga Khan University alumni
American physicians of Pakistani descent